Mutya ng Pilipinas 2001 was the 33rd edition of Mutya ng Pilipinas. It was held at the now closed NBC Tent in Taguig, Metro Manila on June 9, 2001.

At the end of the event, Josephine Canonizado crowned Darlene Carbungco as Mutya ng Pilipinas Asia Pacific 2001. Including her crowned are the new court of winners: Michelle Ann Peñez was named First Runner-Up, Mimilannie Lisondra was named Second Runner-Up, Liza Diño was named Third Runner-Up, and Janice Gay Alop was named Fourth Runner-Up.

Results
Color keys
  The contestant was a Runner-up in an International pageant.
  The contestant was not able to compete in an International pageant.
  The contestant did not place.

Special awards

Major awards

Contestants
25 delegates have been selected to compete this year.

Notes

Crossovers 
 Mutya #2 Nuriza Abeja Jr. was a semifinalist at Binibining Pilipinas 2002.
 Mutya #4 Sandra Rebancos was a candidate at Binibining Pilipinas 2002.
 Mutya #5 Athena Claveria was a candidate at Binibining Pilipinas 2002.
 Mutya #20 Anna Liza Bernal was a semifinalist at Binibining Pilipinas 2000.

Post-pageant notes 
 Mutya ng Pilipinas Asia Pacific, Darlene Carbungco competed at Miss Asia Pacific 2001 in Makati, Philippines and placed 4th runner-up. 
 Mutya 1st runner-up, Michelle Ann Peñez competed at Miss Tourism Universe 2001 and placed 1st runner-up
 Mutya 2nd runner-up, Mimilannie Lisondra did not compete at Miss Intercontinental 2001 pageant
 Mutya third runner-up, Mary Liza Diño competed at Miss Tourism International 2001-2002 in Malaysia but unplaced

References

2001 beauty pageants
2001 in the Philippines
2001